Broken pipe may refer to:
 a character ¦, also known as a broken bar
 a condition in programming (also known in POSIX as EPIPE error code and SIGPIPE signal), when a process requests an output to pipe or socket, which was closed by peer